Helen King (born 1 March 1972) is a Scottish-born Canadian actress and puppeteer.

Biography
King graduated from Queen's University Department of Drama in 1994, moving to Montreal, Quebec in 1995. As well as acting for independent local companies, King worked for Centaur Theatre, Geordie Productions, Just for Laughs Theatre and Theatre Lac Brome. For a-year-and-a-half, King played the cotton ball-like lead role in Me Too! on CBC Television. She starred as the voices of Fumiko & Lisa in Discovery Kids' Jacques Cousteau's Ocean Tales, was narrator for the acclaimed documentary "Black Coffee" and the travel series Rails of Adventure and was a guest voice on several other voice series including Totally Spies, Arthur, Creepschool, Mona the Vampire, and Potatoes & Dragons. She relocated to Toronto in early 2006, continuing her voice-over career in various animation and commercial projects. She has received widespread attention for taking over the role of Farah in The Two Thrones, an installment in Ubisoft's popular Prince of Persia video game series. She has acted in the movies Still Life, Wedding Night, and The Ghosts of Dickens' Past.

Filmography

Film
The Ghosts of Dickens' Past (1998, as Servant Rebecca)
Nuit de noces (2001, as Petite femme de chambre)
Amnesia: The James Brighton Enigma (2005, as Journalist)
Still Life (2007, as Tax Clerk)
Angora Napkin (2009, as Molly)

Television
Misguided Angels (1999, one episode, as Clare)
Arthur (2000, 1 episode, as Suzette)
Mona the Vampire (2003, 1 episode, as Roberta Gotto / Robot)
Kaput and Zösky: The Ultimate Obliterators (2002 – 2003, 6 episodes, as various)
Potatoes and Dragons (2004, 78 episodes, as Big Mama / Miss Leafy)
Creepschool (2004, 2 episodes, as Enchanted Mirror / Video Game)
Canadian Case Files (2005, 1 episode, as Kittye Schmidt)
Runaway (2006, 1 episode, as Family Member)
Odd Job Jack (2007, 2 episodes, as Lawyer / Trish)
Magi-Nation (2007 – 2008, 6 episodes, as Shimmer / Baby Orathan / Swip/ Weave hyren)
Toot & Puddle (2008, 1 episode, as Arara)
Dex Hamilton: Alien Entomologist (2009, 1 episode, as Black Widow)
The Amazing Spiez! (2009, 2 episodes, as Melinda / Boss)
Cyberchase (2009, 1 episode, as Razzle; 2022, 1 episode, as Crustacea)
Being Erica (2009, 2 episodes, as Woman #1 / Co-worker #2)
Pearlie (2009, 1 episode, as Astrid / Lady Person)
Caillou (2010, 1 episode, as Eye Doctor)
The Dating Guy (2010, 2 episodes, as Fiona / Jeanie)
Redakai: Conquer the Kairu (2012, 1 episode, as Slanva)
Murdoch Mysteries (2012, 1 episode, as Mrs. Wilson)
Fugget About It (2012, 7 episodes, as Dancer / Field Girls Leader / Rita)
Ella the Elephant (2012, 1 episode, as Ms. Everheart)
Hemlock Grove (2013, 1 episode, as Librarian)
Reign (2015, 1 episode, as Deputy's Wife)
The ZhuZhus (2016, 1 episode, as Teacher)
Ranger Rob (as Rob's Mom)
Dot. (2016, as Rangeroo Leader)
Rusty Rivets Ranger Anna, recurring role
Corn & Peg
Glowbies (2021, 26 episodes, as Alby)

Video games
Prince of Persia: The Two Thrones (2005, as Farah)

References

Sources

External links
 
 voice clip

1972 births
Living people
Actresses from Montreal
Anglophone Quebec people
Canadian film actresses
Canadian television actresses
Canadian voice actresses
Canadian puppeteers
People from Dunfermline
Scottish emigrants to Canada
Singers from Montreal
Queen's University at Kingston alumni
21st-century Canadian women singers